The following is a list of medical schools (or universities with a medical school), in North America.

Canada

Caribbean

Central America

Costa Rica
Colegio Universitario San Judas Tadeo
Escuela Autonoma de Ciencas Medicas de Centro America
Universidad Autonoma de Centro America
Universidad de Ciencias Médicas (UCIMED)
Universidad de Costa Rica
Universidad de Iberoamerica (UNIBE)
Universidad Hispanoamerica
Universidad Internacional de Las Americas
Universidad Latina de Costa Rica

El Salvador
Facultad de Ciencias de la Salud "Dr. Luis Edmundo Vasquez", Universidad Dr. José Matías Delgado
Facultad de Medicina, Universidad de El Salvador (Public, est. 1847)
Universidad Evangelica de El Salvador
Universidad Nueva San Salvador
Universidad Salvadorena Alberto Masferrer

Guatemala
Universidad de San Carlos de Guatemala
Universidad Francisco Marroquin
Universidad Mariano Galvez
Universidad Rafael Landivar
 Universidad Mesoamericana Quetzaltenango

Honduras
Universidad Catolica de Honduras (UNICAH)
Universidad Nacional Autónoma de Honduras (UNAH), Facultad de Ciencias Medicas
Universidad Tecnologica Centroamericana (UNITEC) Facultad de Ciencias de la Salud

Panamá
Escuela de Medicina, Latin University of Panama
Escuela de Medicina, Universidad Latinoamericana de Ciencia y Tecnología
International School of Medical Sciences
University of Panama

Mexico
Division of Health Sciences, University of Quintana Roo
Instituto Politecnico Nacional, CICS Milpa Alta
Instituto Politécnico Nacional, Escuela Nacional de Medicina y Homeopatía
Instituto Politécnico Nacional, Escuela Superior de Medicina
Instituto Tecnologico y de Estudios Superiores de Monterrey
Universidad Anáhuac, Escuela de Medicina
Universidad Autónoma "Benito Juárez" de Oaxaca, Facultad de Medicina
Universidad Autónoma de Aguascalientes, Centro de Ciencias de la Salud
Universidad Autónoma de Baja California (UABC), Facultad de Medicina
Universidad Autónoma de Campeche, Facultad de Medicina
Universidad Autónoma de Chiapas, Facultad de Medicina Humana
Universidad Autónoma de Coahuila (Unidad Torreón), Facultad de Medicina 
Universidad Autónoma de Guadalajara, Facultad de Medicina
Universidad Autónoma de Nuevo León (UANL), Facultad de Medicina
Universidad Autónoma de Querétaro, Facultad de Medicina
Universidad Autónoma de San Luis Potosí, Facultad de Medicina
Universidad Autónoma de Sinaloa, Facultad de Medicina
Universidad Autónoma de Veracruz “Villa Rica”, Facultad de Medicina
Universidad Autónoma de Yucatán, Facultad de Medicina
Universidad Autonoma Metropolitana
Universidad de Guadalajara, Facultad de Medicina
Universidad de Guanajuato, Facultad de Medicina
Universidad de Monterrey (UDEM)
Universidad del Ejército y Fuerza Aérea, Escuela Médico Militar
Universidad del Mayab, Escuela de Medicina
Universidad del Valle de Mexico
Universidad Juarez Autonoma de Tabasco
Universidad Juarez del Estado de Durango Campus, Durango
Universidad Juarez del Estado de Durango Campus, Gomez Palacio
Universidad La Salle, Facultad de Medicina
Universidad Latinoamericana, Escuela de Medicina
Universidad México Americana del Norte A.C., Escuela de Medicina
Universidad Michoacana de San Nicolás de Hidalgo. Facultad de Ciencias Médicas y Biológicas "Dr. Ignacio Chávez"
Universidad Nacional Autónoma de México, Facultad de Medicina
Universidad Nacional Autónoma de México, Facultad de Estudios Superiores Iztacala
Universidad Nacional Autónoma de México, Facultad de Estudios Superiores Zaragoza
Universidad Panamericana. Escuela de Medicina
Universidad Veracruzana, Facultad de Medicina
Universidad Westhill, Escuela de Medicina, Ciudad de Mexico
Universidad Xochicalco, Escuela de Medicina, Ensenada
Universidad Xochicalco, Escuela de Medicina, Mexicali
Universidad Xochicalco, Escuela de Medicina, Tijuana

United States

References

External links
World Directory of Medical Schools

 
North America